Gaga Chkhetiani (born 24 June 1983) is a Georgian footballer.

Honours
Georgian League:
Runner-up (2): 2002–03, 2004–05
Georgian Cup:
Runner-up (2): 2004, 2013
Meore Liga West:
Winner (1): 2015–16
Runner-up (1): 2014–15
Meore Liga West 2014-15 Top Goalscorer (34 goals)

References

External links

1983 births
Living people
Footballers from Georgia (country)
Expatriate footballers in Israel
Expatriate sportspeople from Georgia (country) in Israel
FC Metalurgi Rustavi players
FC Torpedo Kutaisi players
FC Dinamo Batumi players
Hapoel Nir Ramat HaSharon F.C. players
Sektzia Ness Ziona F.C. players
Maccabi Netanya F.C. players
Hapoel Kfar Saba F.C. players
Maccabi Be'er Sheva F.C. players
Israeli Premier League players
Liga Leumit players
Association football forwards